Rokas Zubovas (born 31 July 1966) is a Lithuanian pianist.

While still a student at the Lithuanian Academy of Music, Zubovas won the VI Inter-Republical Čiurlionis competition, ex-aequo with Moldovan pianist Ina Chatipova. He continued his studies in Switzerland and the USA, where he was a teacher at Chicago's Saint Xavier University's Department of Music starting from 1994, a position he combined with the first stages of his international concert career. Six years later he returned to his homeland, where he was appointed a teacher at the Lithuanian Academy of Music. He's known for his dedication to the music of Mikalojus K. Čiurlionis, who was his great-grandfather. In the biographical film Letters to Sofija he played the role of Čiurlionis.

References
 Impetus Musicus
 harmonies.com

Lithuanian classical pianists
1966 births
Living people
Lithuanian Academy of Music and Theatre alumni
21st-century classical pianists
Lithuanian people of Russian descent